The Tillman School is a historic school building at 191 Cotton Hill Road (United States Route 321) in Tillman, South Carolina.  It is a single-story T-shaped brick building with Craftsman styling.  Its roof has extended eaves with exposed rafter tails, and large knee brackets for support.  The interior is little altered since its construction.  The school was built in 1926-27 as part of a consolidation of local district schools.  It was closed in 1963.

The building was listed on the National Register of Historic Places in 2016. Today it is owned by the Morris Center for Lowcountry Heritage.

See also
National Register of Historic Places listings in Jasper County, South Carolina

References

School buildings on the National Register of Historic Places in South Carolina
Buildings and structures in Jasper County, South Carolina
National Register of Historic Places in Jasper County, South Carolina